Nanaimo is a city in the Canadian province of British Columbia.

Nanaimo may also refer to:

 Regional District of Nanaimo
 Nanaimo Harbour
 Nanaimo Museum
 Nanaimo Bastion
 Nanaimo Airport
 Nanaimo Port Authority
 Nanaimo Harbour ferry terminal
 Nanaimo Harbour Water Aerodrome
 Nanaimo Regional Transit System
 Nanaimo station
 Nanaimo station (Via Rail)
 Nanaimo River
 Nanaimo Lakes
 Nanaimo Station, an elevated Skytrain station in East Vancouver, British Columbia
 , several warships
 Nanaimo bar, a dessert bar of Canadian origin
 For the list of various electoral districts, past and present, see List of electoral districts in Greater Nanaimo